Henry Ralph Winkler (October 27, 1916 – December 26, 2012), historian, was president of the University of Cincinnati from 1977 to 1984.  Winkler was the only UC graduate to hold the office of president of the university. He was selected to serve as president in December, 1977.  Prior to his position at Cincinnati he served as vice president of Rutgers University. He was succeeded at Cincinnati by Joseph A Steger.

References

 

1916 births
2012 deaths
University of Cincinnati faculty
University of Cincinnati alumni
Presidents of the University of Cincinnati